Vanessa Schmoranzer (van Kooperen) (born 27 July 1972 in Bergisch Gladbach) is a German former field hockey player who competed in the 1996 Summer Olympics.

References

External links
 

1972 births
Living people
German female field hockey players
Olympic field hockey players of Germany
Field hockey players at the 1996 Summer Olympics
People from Bergisch Gladbach
Sportspeople from Cologne (region)